Joe Sirois (born January 25, 1972) is an American drummer who plays with The Mighty Mighty Bosstones. He also played drums for the Boston-based band Street Dogs from 2004 to 2007.

Sirois, who grew up in Andover, Massachusetts, knew Bosstone's frontman Dicky Barrett from time shared at Bunker Hill Community College.  He replaced former drummer Josh Dalsimer on the band's first American tour and played on More Noise and Other Disturbances and subsequent albums.

Sirois plays on Yamaha Maple Custom series drums with a twenty-inch kick, Sabian cymbals, a twelve-inch tom, a fourteen-inch tom, and a sixteen-inch tom.

The Street Dogs have recorded two albums with him, Back to the World and Fading American Dream.  Joe has also drummed for punk rock bands Roll The Tanks, Jackson United, Bash & Pop, The Aggrolites, and Frank Black and the Catholics.

He currently drums for The Mighty Mighty Bosstones and Bash & Pop.

References

Living people
American punk rock drummers
American male drummers
1972 births
Musicians from Massachusetts
People from Andover, Massachusetts
Bunker Hill Community College alumni
Jackson United members
20th-century American drummers
Bash & Pop members
The Mighty Mighty Bosstones members
Street Dogs members
21st-century American drummers
20th-century American male musicians
21st-century American male musicians